Asociația Fotbal Club 1919 Dacia Unirea Brăila, commonly known as Dacia Unirea Brăila, is a Romanian football club based in the city of Brăila, Brăila County, which competes in the Liga III.

Founded in 1919, among the team's best performances are a sixth-place top division finish in the 1991–92 season and having reached a Cupa României final the following campaign.

The players of Dacia Unirea are nicknamed "the White and Blues" or "the Lions of Cozmoc" (Leii lui Cozmoc), and their home games have been hosted by the Stadionul Municipal since 1974. The club's most notable rivalry is the one against Oțelul Galați.

History
Dacia Brăila was founded in 1919 around the same time with another team, Unirea. Until 1928, when the two merge their collective and Dacia Unirea appears, each separately participated in the regional championship.

In November 1929 Dacia Unirea had the following base team: Padimatopol (Căpreanu), Stanciu, Vasiliu, Leo (Săvulescu), Fritz, Grigoriou, Anastasios, Leșu, I. Goldenberg, Teodorescu (Frătescu, Cavada, Geller, Munteanu). In the 1929–1930 season the team won the regional tournament and qualified for the national championship tournament. In the quarter-finals they were eliminated by Juventus Bucharest, the team that won the championship that year.

Early years of football (1919-1950)

Afterwards, Dacia Unirea played in the Divizia B between the years 1934–1937, 1938–1940 and in the Divizia A between the years 1937–1938, 1940–1941, the name of the team and of the club changing a few times: D.U.I.G. (Dacia Unirea Ignatz Goldenberg) in 1937, Dacia Unirea in 1938 and FC Brăila in 1940.

During the war it activated in the Cupa Eroilor. After the war, the club changed its name back to the traditional "Dacia Unirea", and participated at only one season of the Divizia C, in the season 1946–1947, after which it disappeared from all divisional levels. We can mention a part of the players who played in that period: I. Goldenberg, N. Stanciu, Hagiopol, Saramet, Weiss, Cavadia, Bonațiu, V. Pop, Negrescu, Drăghicescu, Pascalide, D. Stanciu.

Hard times (1950-1965)

After 1949, when both teams (Dacia Unirea Brăila and Franco-Româna Brăila) disappear from all the divisional levels, the football in Brăila sees itself in crises, and not being able to get out of it, despite a few attempts to reorganize. Starting with 1953 the situation improves, the club is refounded and changes names successively: Metalul (1953–1956), Energia (1956–1957), Dinamo (1957–1958), Industria Sârmei (1958–1959), C.S.M. (1960–1961), Progresul (1962–1963), Laminorul (1963–1964), Constructorul (1964–1965), again Progresul (1965–1975), FC Brăila (1975–1980), FCM Progresul (1980–1991), Dacia Unirea (1991–2006) and finally CF Brăila starting with the 2006–2007 season. Taking into consideration these historical conditions, with a lot of problems in the organisation department, the participation in the divisional system after 1953 is as it follows: 10 times in Liga III (1956–1959, 1963–1964, 1967–1968, 1999–2001, 2007–2010), 41 times in Liga II (1953, 1954, 1960–1963, 1964–1967, 1968–1990, 1994–1999, 2001–2007, 2010 – present) and 4 times in Liga I (1990–1994).

Dacia Unirea, ascension (1965-1994)
The team that succeeded to bring Brăila back to the Divizia A, after half a century, in 1990, had the following players:Ionel Dinu, C Brătianu-V. Brătianu II, Vasile Darie, Gh. Negoiță, Cristea Rusu, Minciu Sandu – M. Anton, A. Marin, Muscă, N. Pascu, M. Petrache, N. Rădulescu, A. Stamate, Titirișcă – Cujbă, Drăgoi, E. Popescu, Vio. Radu, M. Săvescu, M. Ivan. Coach: Bujor Hălmageanu.

In the 1992–1993 season the team qualified in the Cupa României final (its best performance so far), coach Ioan Sdrobiș (who came at half season to replace Gheorghe Mulțescu) had at his service the following players: C. Brătianu I, Hăisan, Nicoloff – G. Baciu, Adrian Baldovin, Vasile Brătianu, Vasile Darie, Gh. Negoiță, Tudorel Pelin, Sandu Minciu – Burleanu, Drăgoi, Jica, M. Lazăr, Matincă, Măstăcan, M. Petrache, Titirișcă – Cujbă, Dochia, C. Luca, Marcadonatu, Mașcu, Arben Minga, Marius Șumudică. Coaches who were in charge of the team worth mentioning: I. Economu, Viorel Mateianu, Ionel Iuga, Dumitru Nicolae "Nicușor", C. Oțet, Dumitru Dumitriu III, V. Dridea II. Special merits go to committed chairmen who obtained great results in charge of the club, especially to Octavian Ulman.

Decline of football (1994-2006)
Four years after the relegations from the Divizia A came that from the Divizia B (in 1999), the tear between the club and Insula Mare a Brăilei (its main sponsor) having disastrous consequences. Actually, prior to that, the main event that triggered the fall happened during the 1994–1995 season. Fighting at the time with Selena Bacău for the promotion to the Divizia A, the team from Brăila was stopped by a corruption case at a game with FC Politehnica Iaşi, in which, in exchange for a sum of money, the team from Dealul Copoului should have conceded the game. The case was highly mediated, ending up with arrests, Ilie Trifina (Dacia Unirea's competition organiser) and Leonard Cănănău (journalist from Iași, ex football player). Dacia Unirea ended up with an 8-point penalty, and being forbidden to participate at the qualification knock-out for the promotion to the Divizia A. The team succeeded to make a comeback to the Divizia B in 2001.

Reformation (2006-2015)

At the end of the 2006–2007 CF Brăila was relegated to the Liga III. Their best performance during this period was the acceding to the Cupa României quarter-finals in the 2004–2005 season, where they lost to Dinamo București 1–0 at Stadionul Dinamo and 2–0 at Stadionul Municipal. In the round of 32, Dacia Unirea won against Rapid București (coached at the time by Răzvan Lucescu) at Stadionul Municipal, goal scored by Romeo Buteseacă and in the round of 16, they passed by FC Unirea Alba Iulia with 2–0, goals scored by Romeo Buteseacă and Cristian Dicu. Players who had a great contribution to this performance, among others, are: Marius Mindileac, Iulian Olteanu;– Laurențiu Ivan, Gheorghe Rădulescu, Valentin Stan, Victor Olenic, Tudorel Pelin, Nicolae Ciocea – Daniel Pleșa, Dumitru Horovei, Mihalache Basalîc, Cristian Dicu;– Romeo Buteseacă, Marius Matei, Paul Sorin Bogdan. We also have to mention Bănel Nicoliță, who played at Dacia Unirea until 2004 and where he made his debut.

The 2008/09 season meant some serious reorganisation, SC CONCIVIA SA became the owner of the team, and the objective was the promotion to the Liga II. But in the end, the club finished 8th the Championship, and it seemed that Liga II was further than was thought.

The 2009/10 season has started with a lot of promise. During the summer, Gheorghe Mulțescu was appointed advisor with the transfers, and a lot of promising players were bought. At the end of the first half of the championship, the club sees itself on the top of the table, 1st, in the run with Politehnica II Iași, Petrotub Roman and CS Panciu for the promotion.

At half season, coach Vasile Darie was replaced with Daniel Timofte and the season ended with the victory and the promotion to the Liga II, and to top it all, Nelu Bucă finished 1st in the goalscorers ranking, with 25 goals.

Brăila started poorly the 2010/11 season, by being eliminated from the Romanian Cup in the 4th Round by Unirea Slobozia and by being last in the championship after five rounds, with only one point. After round five of the championship, Gheorghe Bunea Stancu replaced Daniel Timofte with Liviu Ciobotariu., but brought Timofte back after round 10 of the championship, after the disaster at Piatra Neamţ, 0–4 with Ceahlăul, thus concluding Ciobotariu's charge in front of our club, and like Timofte, with only one point obtained in five matches. Timofte's return had no success, the club ranking last at the end of the first half of the championship, with only four points in 15 rounds.

The second half of the championship was more productive, CF Brăila managing to raise 17 more points, totaling 21 in the end, but not enough to avoid relegation, finishing next to last in the series. But all was not lost, because Unirea Urziceni withdrew from the 2011–12 Liga II season, this meaning that our club could play in its place.

CF Brăila had an excellent run in the first half of the 2011–12 Liga II, ranking 5th during the winter brake, just three points behind the second-placed team, Săgeata Năvodari. It finished 6th at the end of the championship.

Return to Dacia Unirea name (2015-present)

In 2015, the club decided to return to its first name, Dacia Unirea.

Stadium

Dacia Unirea Brăila plays its home matches at the Municipal Stadium, Brăila, which has a capacity of 20,000.

The stadium was opened on 21 August 1974 and was built on the ground of the old Vasile Roaită Stadium, a small stadium that had only one stand.

The original capacity was 30,000 on benches. A general renovation occurred in 2008. This included installing seats, which dropped the capacity to 20,154, making the 10th stadium in the country, by capacity. (List of football stadiums in Romania)

European record

Honours

Leagues
Liga II
Winners (2): 1934–35, 1989–90
Runners-up (6): 1935–36, 1974–75, 1975–76, 1988–89, 1994–95, 1995–96
Liga III
Winners (3): 1963–64, 2000–01, 2009–10
Runners-up (3): 1957–58, 1967–68, 2020–21

Cups
Romanian Cup
Runners-up (1): 1992–93

Other Performances
Appearances in Liga I: 6
Best finish in Liga I: 6th in 1991–92
The most successful team from Brăila County
Semi-finalist of 1992–93, Balkans Cup

Players

First team squad

Club officials

Board of directors

Current technical staff

Statistics

Up to and including the end of the 2012–13 season

Notable managers

Robert Cosmoc
Virgil Dridea
Nicolae Tătaru
Vasile Coteț
Petre Iancu
Ioan Sdrobiș
Ion Gigi
Gheorghe Mulțescu
Dumitru Nicolae
Marian Oprea
Ionel Iuga
Vasile Grosu
Eugen Tudose
Pavel Buburuz
Vasile Simionaș
Constantin Oțet
Daniel Timofte
Viorel Ion
Liviu Ciobotariu
Franz Platko

League history

References

External links
 
 

Brăila
Football clubs in Brăila County
Association football clubs established in 1919
Liga I clubs
Liga II clubs
Liga III clubs
1919 establishments in Romania